Julien "Cousi" Cousineau (born January 17, 1981) is a Canadian alpine skier. He is competed in the 2010 Winter Olympics.

Cousineau began his career in 1998.

He was named Alpine Canada's 2003 Breakthrough Male Athlete of the Year.

He resides in Lachute, Quebec, Canada where he works as a councillor when not skiing.

References

1981 births
Alpine skiers at the 2010 Winter Olympics
Canadian male alpine skiers
French Quebecers
Living people
Olympic alpine skiers of Canada

People from Lachute
Sportspeople from Quebec